Panchià (Pancià in local dialect) is a comune (municipality) in Trentino in the northern Italian region Trentino-Alto Adige/Südtirol, located about  northeast of Trento.

Panchià borders the following municipalities: Predazzo, Tesero, Ziano di Fiemme and Pieve Tesino.

References

Cities and towns in Trentino-Alto Adige/Südtirol